Jonathan Lewis (born 26 August 1975) is a former England cricketer and current Head Coach of England Women's Cricket and UP Warriorz in Women's Premier League. He was brought up in Swindon where he was educated at Churchfields School and Swindon College.  He played for Swindon CC and, in Minor Counties cricket, for Wiltshire County Cricket Club in 1993. He joined Northamptonshire in 1994 and played for its Second XI but returned to Wiltshire in 1995. In the same year, he joined Gloucestershire and made his first-class debut. He has played for the English cricket team in Twenty20, One Day International and Test matches. He was appointed Gloucestershire captain in 2006.

In 2005, Lewis was included in the England squad for the two Tests against Bangladesh, but did not play in either match. He did, however, make his first international appearance in the Twenty20 game against Australia in June, and took 4–24 in his four overs as England recorded a crushing 100-run victory. He made his One Day International debut a few days later in England's win against Bangladesh at The Oval, again impressing with 3–32 from ten overs. He was included in the 13-man squad for the home series against Sri Lanka in 2006, making his Test debut at Trent Bridge on 2 June 2006 and taking a wicket with his fourth delivery (and third legitimate ball) in Test cricket. He is the 634th player to represent England at Test cricket.

He was selected in a number of Test squads during the summer of 2006, but only played in one Test against Sri Lanka, coming to be regarded as something of a perennial 12th man. He did however bowl well in the ODIs against Pakistan, having finally been given an extended run in the side. Lewis was selected in England's 15-man squad for the Cricket World Cup 2007, which was held in the Caribbean. His most recent appearance for England was a sole appearance in the 2007 limited overs series against India.

On 29 July 2011, it was announced that after 16 years with Gloucestershire, Lewis was to join Surrey on a two-year deal. Lewis left Surrey at the end of the 2013 season to join Sussex on a one-year contract ahead of the 2014 season. On 28 November 2014, Lewis announced his retirement from the professional game to become bowling coach at Sussex.

In 2015 was appointed as Assistant Head Coach at Sussex County Cricket Club. In 2016 Lewis started as the Head Coach for England Young Lions. In March 2021, he was appointed as England Fast Bowling Coach, working with the likes of Jofra Archer, Mark Wood and Ben Stokes.

Lewis has now been announced as Head Coach of England Women's Cricket. Lewis and his new team will depart for West Indies on November 29, 2022.

References

External links
 
 Never knowingly underbowled from Cricinfo
 Player Profile from Gloucestershire County Cricket Club website

1975 births
Living people
English cricketers
English people of Welsh descent
Gloucestershire cricket captains
Gloucestershire cricketers
Marylebone Cricket Club cricketers
Northamptonshire cricketers
Surrey cricketers
Sussex cricketers
Wiltshire cricketers
England Twenty20 International cricketers
England One Day International cricketers
England Test cricketers
Sportspeople from Aylesbury
Sportspeople from Swindon
First-Class Counties Select XI cricketers